The Prince of Thieves is a 1948 American adventure film nominally inspired by Alexandre Dumas' 1872 novel Le Prince des voleurs.  Produced by Sam Katzman for Columbia Pictures and starring Jon Hall as Robin Hood with stuntwork by Jock Mahoney, the film was shot in the Cinecolor process that features an inability to reproduce the colour green. Sequences were shot reusing several of the sets of Columbia's The Bandit of Sherwood Forest and at Corriganville.<ref>[http://www.afi.com/members/catalog/DetailView.aspx?s=&Movie=25686 The AFI Catalog of Feature Films:The Prince of Thieves]</ref> Patricia Morison and Adele Jergens co-star.

Plot
After fighting in the Crusades alongside King Richard I of England, Sir Allan Claire is returning home to marry his betrothed Lady Christabel. He and his sister Lady Marian Claire are intercepted by Robin Hood and his band of Merry Men. Recognising a friend of King Richard, Robin informs them that Lady Christabel is to be married to another against her will in the interest of politics and her father's fortune. The three team up to rescue the fair lady.

Cast
 Jon Hall as Robin Hood
 Patricia Morison as Lady Marian Claire
 Adele Jergens as Lady Christabel
 Alan Mowbray as The Friar
 Michael Duane as Sir Allan Claire
 H. B. Warner as Gilbert Head
 Robin Raymond as Maude
 Lowell Gilmore as Sir Phillip
 Belle Mitchell as Margaret Head (uncredited)
 Gavin Muir as Baron Tristram (uncredited)
 Walter Sande as Little John (uncredited)
 Syd Saylor as Will Scarlet (uncredited)
 Lewis Russell as Sir Fitz-Alwin (uncredited)

Production
Alexander Dumas' 1872 novel was translated into French from an 1836 romance by Pierce Egan.

The idea for making the film came from Charles Schneer who worked for producer Sam Katzman. Katzman enjoyed making films from books in the public domain and Schneer discovered the title listed among the works of Alexander Dumas. Schneer's original intent was to write an original scenario just using the title, but once he had the work translated into English, Katzman wanted an adaptation of the book.

At this stage in his career, Katzman specialised in shooting musicals for Columbia over nine days with a budget of $140,000. He was so enthused by this project but he arranged to secure a budget of $400,000, including $100,000 for cast, and colour photography.

George Plympton was reported as working on the script in January 1947. Jon Hall's casting was announced in March.

At one stage three people were directing the film - Max Nosseckwith the main cast, Derwin Abrahams on the silent sequences, and Howarth Bretheron with the action sequences.

The censor objected to depictions of Friar Tuck being interested in worldly pleasures and the character had to be toned down.

Critical receptionAllmovie called the film a "decided B-picture effort" and wrote that its Cinecolor "lacked the glowing luster" of the Technicolor used in the earlier The Bandit of Sherwood Forest; he also noted that the soundtrack was mostly stock music from the Columbia library. The reviewer also noted the movie's aim at younger audiences and male filmgoers, and concluded: "The one true oddity in the movie, and its most offbeat element, is the presence of Patricia Morison as Lady Marian, who seems to be exercising some of the shrewishness than would finally put her on the map as an actress, by way of the Broadway stage, a year later in Cole Porter's Kiss Me, Kate. All of these disparate elements may not hold together ideally, but with a running time of scarcely more than an hour and a cast that is trying hard to make it all fun, it's impossible for a picture like this to go far wrong, even if it gets nowhere near to being high art, either". TV Guide'' called the film "mainly a kiddie picture" and noted that "of the Merry Men, it is Mowbray as Friar Tuck who steals the show with a performance that borders on slapstick".

References

External links
 
 Review of film at Variety

1948 adventure films
1948 films
Cinecolor films
Columbia Pictures films
Films based on works by Alexandre Dumas
Robin Hood films
American adventure films
Films with screenplays by Charles H. Schneer
Films directed by Howard Bretherton
1940s American films